The 2014 Russian Cup Final decided the winner of the 2013–14 Russian Cup, the 22nd season of Russia's main football cup. It was played on 8 May 2014 at the Anzhi Arena in Kaspiysk, between Russian Premier League sides Krasnodar and Rostov.

After drawing the game 0–0 through added extra time, Rostov won 6–5 in a dramatic penalty shoot-out that saw both sides miss penalty kicks.

The shoot-out win brought relief for Rostov, winning their first major trophy having lost the 2003 Russian Cup final to FC Spartak Moscow 0–1.

As winners, FC Rostov qualified for the group stage of the UEFA Europa League and also faced CSKA Moscow, champions of the 2013–14 Russian Premier League, in the Russian Super Cup on 26 July 2014.

Road to the final

Match details

References

External links
  Russian Cup on the website of the Russian Football Union
  Department of professional football of the Russian Football Union
  Russian Cup at the RFPL website
  Russia - Cup Finals, RSSSF.com

Russian Cup finals
Cup
Russian Cup
Sport in Dagestan
FC Krasnodar matches
FC Rostov matches
Russian Cup Final 2014